The Nepean River railway bridge is a heritage-listed railway bridge that carries the Main Southern railway line across Menangle Road and the Nepean River located at the outer south-western Sydney settlement of Menangle in the Wollondilly Shire local government area of New South Wales, Australia. It was designed by John Whitton as the Engineer-in-Chief, of the New South Wales Government Railways and NSW Department of Public Works. The railway bridge was built in 1863 by Messers Peto, Brassey and Betts. It is also known as Menangle rail bridge over Nepean River and Menangle Railway Bridge. The property was added to the New South Wales State Heritage Register on 2 April 1999.

History 
The Menangle Bridge is the first large iron railway bridge erected in New South Wales, whereas the first large railway bridge, an eight-span stone arch viaduct, was opened at Lewisham in 1855. The bridge opened in 1863. It was the first large iron railway bridge on the New South Wales Government Railways network. The bridge was manufactured in England by The Canada Works in Birkenhead. The bridge opened on 1 July 1863 with the line from Campbelltown station to Picton station. In 1907, the bridge was strengthened with intermediate piers and extra girders added.

When John Whitton planned the railway extension from Campbelltown to Picton, he was under pressure from the Government to keep costs low by using as much local material as possible. A metal girder design had been proposed by contractors Peto, Brassey and Betts but Whitton substituted a timber bridge made from ironbark and other strong hardwoods, a relatively short , low level crossing.

It was a massive structure for its time, comprising  of masonry,  of brickwork and  tons of wrought iron for a total cost of A£94,562.

The iron superstructure was manufactured in England at the Canada Works, Birkenhead (opposite Liverpool) and shipped out in December 1861. One ship arrived in Sydney in April 1862 but the other was wrecked at the entrance to the Mersey River. However, the replacement ironwork was delivered to Sydney in December 1862.

Construction of the locally quarried sandstone abutments and piers were completed in October 1862 and the iron bridge was assembled ready for service by June 1863. Load testing, by three locomotives in full steam, followed and the line to Picton was opened on 1 July 1863.

The use of a continuous superstructure was technically significant because the analysis of such structures was a relatively new, sophisticated procedure. Also, it showed that Whitton and Fowler (London) appreciated the structural benefits that a continuous girder over three spans offered compared to three simply-supported spans.

The sister bridge to the Menangle Bridge was the Victoria Bridge over the Nepean River at Penrith. Their sizes and design were such that they were featured in an international text book Modern Examples of Road and Railway Bridges by William H. Maw and James Dredge, London, 1872.

Description 
Since 1907, when intermediate piers were built in the middle of the three original  spans, the bridge has six  spans. Between the original stone abutments, these additional brick piers alternate with the original stone piers.

The superstructure consists of two massive, wrought iron, cellular (box) girders, continuous from abutment to abutment, no breaks at the piers.

On the outer surfaces of the girders there are pairs of curved angle iron suggesting the inclusion of an arch. These are purely decorative, there is no arch action, the superstructure
is a girder.

At the Sydney end, one of the ornamental tops to a pier was demolished by a derailment in 1976. The iron bridge received only localised superficial damage but the stonework was not replaced, thereby leaving the cellular cross section of the girder exposed.

Condition 

As at 26 April 2006, the physcial condition is good.

Apart from the inclusion of the intermediate piers in 1907, the 1863 Menangle Bridge retains most of its original fabric.

Modifications and dates 
The principal modification was the building of the intermediate piers in 1907 which, by halving the original spans, greatly increased the load capacity of the bridge such that it is still in service carrying modern heavy, fast rail traffic. The original iron bridge was flanked by timber viaducts which were replaced by steel girders in 1923.

In 1993 Consulting Engineers, Dames & Moore of North Sydney, recommended a number of actions for a general refurbishment of the main bridge, some minor repairs, cleaning up and painting, maintenance to the bearings and the like, but no major changes.

In March 2003, the bridge was closed for one month while repairs were carried out. It was announced in April 2003, the bridge would be replaced but to date this has not happened.

In 2013 it was increased to the maximum line speed.

Heritage listing 
As at 16 April 2003, the Menangle Railway Bridge, constructed in 1863 over the Nepean River, is one of the most historic bridges in Australia because:

(a) it was the first large iron bridge in New South Wales and the largest bridge until the 1889 Hawkesbury River railway bridge;
(b) it has a dominant appearance in a rural landscape;
(c) it shares in the enormous benefits, social and commercial, that the Main South Railway has made to New South Wales in 140 years; and 
(d) it was a technically advanced design for its time and received international recognition in 1872.

The Menangle and Victoria Bridges are the only bridges of their type in New South Wales. They are excellent examples of heavy duty, wrought iron girder bridges continuous over three spans. Apart from the inclusion of the intermediate piers in 1907, the 1863 Menangle Bridge Retains most of its original fabric.

The Menangle rail bridge constructed in 1863 is the oldest surviving bridge on the State rail system and is of highest significance in the development of railway technology in the State. It is an excellent example of early bridge construction. The bridge is one of two identical bridges constructed for the NSW Railways, the other being over the Nepean River at Penrith. The Penrith Bridge was opened in 1867 but has been used for road traffic since 1907. The Menangle rail bridge is typical of British bridge engineering of the 1860s, the iron spans having been fully imported. Additional supporting piers were later erected under the spans so that heavier engines could be used on the main south line. The bridge is of national, if not international, significance as there are few such bridges still in use in the United Kingdom.

Menangle Railway Bridge was listed on the New South Wales State Heritage Register on 2 April 1999 having satisfied the following criteria.

The place is important in demonstrating the course, or pattern, of cultural or natural history in New South Wales.

The 1863 Menangle Railway Bridge over the Nepean River is one of the most historic bridges in Australia. It was the first large iron bridge in New South Wales and the largest bridge until the 1889 Hawkesbury River Bridge.

The place is important in demonstrating aesthetic characteristics and/or a high degree of creative or technical achievement in New South Wales.

The bridge has a dominant appearance in a rural landscape, partly obscured by excessive growth of adjacent trees.

The place has a strong or special association with a particular community or cultural group in New South Wales for social, cultural or spiritual reasons.

The Main South Railway has been an enormous benefit to the social and commercial development of the southern quarter of New South Wales for 140 years, and this bridge,
part of the original railway construction, has shared in the significance of that contribution.

The place has potential to yield information that will contribute to an understanding of the cultural or natural history of New South Wales.

The 3-span continuous girder design was, for the 1860s, a technically sophisticated design that was noted in an international 1872 text book. The cellular construction, whereby the top and bottom parts of the girders are made in the form of two boxes or cells, was a recent development for resisting lateral buckling arising from the famous experiments by Fairfairn and Hodgkinson for the 1849 Britannia Bridge in Wales.

The place possesses uncommon, rare or endangered aspects of the cultural or natural history of New South Wales.

The Menangle and Victoria Bridges are the only bridges of their type in New South Wales.

The place is important in demonstrating the principal characteristics of a class of cultural or natural places/environments in New South Wales.

The Menangle and Victoria Bridges are excellent examples of heavy duty, wrought iron girder bridges continuous over three spans.

Engineering heritage award 
The bridge received an Engineering Heritage Marker from Engineers Australia as part of its Engineering Heritage Recognition Program.

See also 

List of railway bridges in New South Wales
Victoria Bridge (Penrith)

References

Attribution

External links

 
 

Bridges completed in 1863
1863 establishments in Australia
Railway bridges in New South Wales
Menangle
New South Wales State Heritage Register
Articles incorporating text from the New South Wales State Heritage Register
Main Southern railway line, New South Wales
Girder bridges
Wrought iron bridges
Recipients of Engineers Australia engineering heritage markers